Tiber Island Cooperative Homes is a housing complex in the Southwest portion of Washington DC.  The 378 apartments in four nine-story towers and 21 townhouses were built in 1965 as part of a planned redevelopment of the area.   The site was listed on the National Register of Historic Places in 2013 and contains the Thomas Law House, which is also listed.

References

External links

Residential buildings on the National Register of Historic Places in Washington, D.C.
Residential buildings completed in 1965
1965 establishments in Washington, D.C.
Southwest Waterfront